Area 30 can refer to:

 Area 30 (Nevada National Security Site)
 Brodmann area 30